Swingin'  is a 1980 compilation album by American jazz guitarist Kenny Burrell. The album includes five tracks taken from three different studio sessions and a live recording between 1956-1959.

Track listing

Recording sessions
Track 1 recorded at Manhattan Towers, NYC, on May 14, 1958.
Track 2 recorded at Audio-Video Studios, NYC, on March 12, 1956.
Tracks 3, 4, 5 recorded at the Five Spot Café, NYC, on August 25, 1959.

Personnel
Band
Kenny Burrell – guitar
Ben Tucker – bass 
Oscar Pettiford – bass 
Sam Jones – bass 
Art Blakey – drums 
Shadow Wilson – drums 
Bobby Timmons – piano 
Duke Jordan – piano 
Roland Hanna – piano  
Tommy Flanagan – piano 
Frank Foster – tenor sax 
Junior Cook – tenor sax 
Tina Brooks – tenor sax 
Louis Smith – trumpet 

Production
Rudy Van Gelder – engineer
Bob Porter – liner notes
K. Abe – photography 
Alfred Lion – producer
Michael Cuscuna – producer

References

Blue Note Records albums
Kenny Burrell albums
1980 albums